Kitchener—Waterloo was a provincial electoral district in Ontario, Canada, that was represented in the Legislative Assembly of Ontario from 1999 to 2018. Its population in 2006 was 126,742.  The riding was created in 1996 from parts of Waterloo North, Kitchener—Wilmot and Kitchener.

Geography
The district consists of the City of Waterloo and the northern part of the City of Kitchener.

The electoral district was created as part of the 1996 redistribution of provincial ridings to have the same borders as federal ridings, and first contested in 1999 general election.

It consisted initially of the City of Waterloo and the part of the City of Kitchener lying north of a line drawn from west to east along Highland Road West, Lawrence Avenue and Victoria Street.

In 2003, the Kitchener part of the riding was redefined to be the part of the city lying north of a line drawn from west to east along Highland Road West, Fischer Hallman Road and the Canadian National Railway situated north of Shadeland Crescent.

For the 2018 general election, the riding was dissolved into Waterloo, Kitchener Centre, and Kitchener—Conestoga.

Member of Provincial Parliament

This riding has elected the following members of the Legislative Assembly of Ontario:

Election results

2007 electoral reform referendum

Notes

Sources
Elections Ontario Past Election Results

Former provincial electoral districts of Ontario